The European Cadet Judo Championships are annual judo competitions organized by the European Judo Union for European judoka aged 18 and younger.

The last contest took place in Poreč, Croatia. The next will take place in Coimbra, Portugal.

Competitions

Team competitions

See also
 European Judo Championships
 European U23 Judo Championships
 European Junior Judo Championships

References

 
U18
Judo, U18
U18
European Championships, U18
Judo, European Championships U18